Karen Jennings (born 1982) is a South African author.

Early life and education 
Jennings was born in Cape Town, South Africa, in 1982, the daughter of an Afrikaans mother and an English father; both of her parents were teachers. She has master's degrees in English literature and creative writing from the University of Cape Town, and a PhD in creative writing from the  University of KwaZulu-Natal.  , she is pursuing doctoral work in history at the University of Johannesburg. She has done post-doctoral research at the Federal University of Goiás, Brazil, on the historical relationship between science and literature, with particular reference to eusocial insects.

Career 
Jennings edited Feast, Famine & Potluck, a collection of African short stories published in 2014 by Modjaji Books for Short Story Day Africa. Her first novel Finding Soutbek was shortlisted for the 2013 Etisalat Prize for Literature (now known as the 9mobile Prize for Literature). Her book An Island, written with support from a Miles Moreland Foundation Writing Scholarship, was longlisted for the 2021 Booker Prize.

Personal life 
Jennings is married to a Brazilian scientist and lived in Brazil during the COVID-19 pandemic.

Awards

 Winner English Section of the Maskew Miller Longman Literature Awards, 2009 for "Mia and the Shark" (short story)
 Winner Africa Region Prize of the Commonwealth Short Story Competition, 2010 for "From Dark" (short story)
 Shortlisted Etisalat Prize for Literature, 2013 for Finding Soutbek
 Longlisted The Booker Prize, 2021 for An Island
 Co-winner K. Sello Duiker Memorial Award (one of the annual South African Literary Awards), 2021 for An Island

Works
Finding Soutbek (Holland Park Press, 2013) – novel
Away from the Dead (Holland Park Press, 2014) – short stories
Travels with My Father: An Autobiographical Novel (Holland Park Press, 2016) – novel/memoir 
Space Inhabited by Echoes (Holland Park Press, 2018) – poetry
Upturned Earth (Holland Park Press, 2019) - novel
An Island (Holland House Books, 2020) – novel

References

1982 births
Living people
21st-century South African novelists
21st-century South African women writers
South African women novelists
University of Cape Town alumni
University of KwaZulu-Natal alumni
Writers from Cape Town
South African people of Afrikaner descent
South African people of English descent